The Journal of Fixed Income is a quarterly academic journal that covers quantitative research on fixed income instruments: mortgage-backed securities, high-yield debt, municipal bonds, corporate bonds, asset-backed securities, and global bonds. Its editor-in-chief is Stanley J. Kon (Smith Breeden Associates) and its founding editor was Douglas T. Breeden (Fuqua School of Business at Duke University).  It is published by Euromoney Institutional Investor.

External links
 

Finance journals
Publications established in 1991
Quarterly journals
English-language journals